The 1959 All-Atlantic Coast Conference football team consists of American football players chosen by various selectors for their All-Atlantic Coast Conference ("ACC") teams for the 1959 NCAA University Division football season. Selectors in 1959 included the Associated Press (AP) and the United Press International (UPI).  Players selected to the first team by both the AP and UPI are displayed below in bold.

All-Atlantic Coast selections

Ends
 Pete Manning, Wake Forest (AP-1; UPI-1)
 Gary Barnes, Clemson (AP-1; UPI-1)

Tackles
 Lou Cordileone, Clemson (AP-1; UPI-1)
 Ed Pitts, South Carolina (AP-1; UPI-1)

Guards
 Mike McGee, Duke (AP-1; UPI-1) (College Football Hall of Fame)
 Tom Gunerman, Maryland (AP-1)
 Nick Patella, Wake Forest (UPI-1)

Centers
 Ross "Rip" Hawkins, North Carolina (AP-1)
 Paul Snyder, Clemson (UPI-1)

Backs
 Norm Snead, Wake Forest (AP-1 [QB]; UPI-1)
 Bill Mathis, Clemson (AP-1 [HB]; UPI-1)
 Joel Arrington, Duke (AP-1 [HB]; UPI-1)
 Jim Joyce, Maryland (AP-1 [FB])
 Phil Lavoie, South Carolina (UPI-1)

Key
AP = Associated Press

UPI = United Press International

See also
1959 College Football All-America Team

References

All-Atlantic Coast Conference football team
All-Atlantic Coast Conference football teams